Toprakkale is a town and district of Osmaniye Province in the Mediterranean region of Turkey. It is located at 10 km to the west of Osmaniye. Its name comes from an Abbasid castle near the city.

The town is on a road and rail crossing, a natural intersection of routes between Adana, Hatay and Gaziantep.

History
The great fortress known as Toprakkale (Arabic: Tall Hamdūn; Frankish: Thil Hamd(o)un; Armenian: T'il Hamdun) was founded in the 8th century by the Abbasids.  During the 12th century it was frequently captured by the Byzantines, Crusaders, and Armenians.  In 1266 the Mamluks briefly seized the castle from its Armenian lord and in 1337 permanently removed it from the Armenian Kingdom of Cilicia.  It was seized by the Ottomans in the 1490s when they captured all of Cilicia.

On the summit of a basalt outcrop is the almost rectangular complex which measures 150 meters on its long north-to-south axis, and 105 meters in width.  The walls are protected by numerous round towers and a lethal array of embrasured loopholes (shooting ports).  At the south and east is a second highly fortified wall.  To the west and north is a massive talus with its own system of tunnels. Roughly 100 meters from the base of the outcrop at the west and north is a curving fortified circuit wall which creates a separate ward far larger than the interior of the summit fortress.  Toprakkale appears to be the result of many periods of construction, with the Mamluks as the last of the significant contributors.

References

External links
 District governor's official website 
 District municipality's official website 
 Carefully documented photographic survey and plan of Toprak Castle, Osmaniye 

Towns in Turkey
Populated places in Osmaniye Province
Districts of Osmaniye Province